Chulman is an urban locality (an urban-type settlement) in Neryungrinsky District of the Sakha Republic, Russia, located  from Neryungri, the administrative center of the district, on the Chulman River. As of the 2010 Census, its population was 9,766.

Geography
The town is located in the Aldan Highlands, there is a deep gorge to the east with white cliffs.

History
It was founded with nineteen inhabitants in 1926. Urban-type settlement status was granted to it in 1941. During the late 1940s and early 1950s, it was the location of a gulag work camp.

Administrative and municipal status
Within the framework of administrative divisions, the urban-type settlement of Chulman is incorporated within Neryungrinsky District as the Settlement of Chulman. As a municipal division, the Settlement of Chulman, together with one rural locality (the selo of Bolshoy Khatymi) under direct jurisdiction of Neryungrinsky District, is incorporated within Neryungrinsky Municipal District as Chulman Urban Settlement.

Economy
Employment in Chulman is mainly in the mining of coal, granite, and gemstones industries, as well as at the power station.

Transportation
Chulman is served by the Chulman Airport and is a station on the Amur–Yakutsk Mainline.

Climate
Chulman has a subarctic climate (Köppen climate classification Dfc/Dwc). Precipitation is moderate and is much higher in summer than at other times of the year.

References

Notes

Sources
Official website of the Sakha Republic. Registry of the Administrative-Territorial Divisions of the Sakha Republic. Neryungrinsky District. 

Urban-type settlements in the Sakha Republic